Wheel of Fortune is a historic home located near Leipsic, Delaware. It was built in the 18th century, and is a two-story, five-bay, one room deep whitewashed brick dwelling in the Georgian style.  It has a gable roof and the front facade features a one-bay entrance portico. It has a two-story rear wing, that originally contained a kitchen and servants quarters. Also on the property are a contributing meat house and milk house.  The property was owned by Congressman John A. Nicholson (1827-1906) before 1888, and later by U.S. Senator James H. Hughes (1867-1953), who purchased it in 1910.

The house's name comes from a piece of land by the same name located along Muddy Branch south of Leipsic. While local lore claims the land was named as a play on owner John Chance's name, it was known as Wheel of Fortune at least three years before Chance acquired the land in 1738.

It was listed on the National Register of Historic Places in 1973.

References

External links

Historic American Buildings Survey in Delaware
Houses on the National Register of Historic Places in Delaware
Houses in Kent County, Delaware
Georgian architecture in Delaware
National Register of Historic Places in Kent County, Delaware
Leipsic, Delaware